Mauroniscidae is a family of cleroid beetles, formerly included in the family Melyridae. There are presently five or six genera and roughly 30 described species in Mauroniscidae, all of which are native to the Americas. Almost nothing is known about their biology.

Genera
 Amecomycter Majer, 1995
 Mauroniscus Bourgeois, 1911
 Mecomycter Horn, 1882
 Mectemycor Majer, 1995
 Scuromanius Majer, 1995

Incertae sedis in Mauroniscidae
 Dasyrhadus Fall, 1910

References

Further reading

 
 
 
 
 
 

Cleroidea
Polyphaga families